Ross Jeivon Russell Jr (born 9 January 1992) is a Trinidadian professional footballer who plays as a left-back for the club La Horquetta Rangers and the Trinidad and Tobago national team.

International career
Russel debuted for the Trinidad and Tobago national team in a 1–1 CONCACAF Nations League tie with Martinique on 6 September 2019. He was called up to represent Trinidad and Tobago at the 2021 CONCACAF Gold Cup.

Personal life
Ross is the son of the Trinidadian football manager and former goalkeeper of the same name, Ross Roy Russell. Ross was in jail for 2 years as he awaited charges for the murder of former Diego Martin resident Selwyn Gaff, who died of a gunshot wound. Ross was charged with murder, possession of arms, and shooting with intent to do bodily harm. He was cleared of charges and released on 20 August 2018.

Honours
Defence Force
TT Pro League: 2010–11, 2012–13

References

External links
 
 

1992 births
Living people
People from Diego Martin
Trinidad and Tobago footballers
Trinidad and Tobago international footballers
Trinidad and Tobago youth international footballers
Association football fullbacks
Defence Force F.C. players
St. Ann's Rangers F.C. players
TT Pro League players
2021 CONCACAF Gold Cup players
People acquitted of murder